Javi Navarro may refer to:

 Javi Navarro (footballer, born 1974), Spanish footballer
 Javi Navarro (footballer, born 1997), Spanish footballer